The Japanese anime series Shima Shima Tora no Shimajirō has released several feature-length films.

Feature films

(2013)

 is a 2013 Japanese children's live action/anime film. It's the first film to feature the character Shimajirō. The film is directed by Isamu Hirabayashi and was released on March 15, 2013.

Japanese Voice Cast

Omi Minami- Shimajiro Shimano (voice)
Miki Takahashi- Mimirin (voice)
Takumi Yamazaki- Torippii (voice)
Saori Sugimoto- Nyakkii Momoyama (voice)
Saki Fujita (voice)
Aki Sasamori (voice)
Kinryu Arimoto (voice)
Chafûrin- Shimajiro’s Father (voice)
Kikuko Inoue- Shimajiro's Mother (voice)
Bin Shimada (voice)
Nobuo Tobita (voice)
Shinobu Adachi (voice)
Minoru Inaba (voice)
Yuki Matsuoka (voice)
Mitsuru Ogata (voice)
Chinatsu Akasaki (voice)
Marie Shiba (voice)
Ai Fukada (voice)
Kenji Nomura (voice)
Mei Satô- Fufu the Fairy (voice)
Yûichi Harada- Sawagani male
Naoto Nojima- Sawagani male

Korean Voice Cast

Oh Sang-so- Hobby
Song Young-in- Benny
Lee Woo Lee- Pero
Shin Jung-hoon- Rynh
Sang Woo Park- Dr. Leo

Chinese Voice Cast

Xu Shuxuan- Qiaohu
Yang Kaikai
Liu Xihua
Feng Jiade

(2014)

 is a 2014 Japanese film directed by Isamu Hirabayashi. The theme song of the film is "Kunshou" by Negoto and ending theme song is "Tomodachi no Wao!" by PUFFY.

Japanese Voice Cast

Omi Minami- Shimajiro Shimano (voice)
Miki Takahashi- Mimirin, Hana (voice)
Takumi Yamazaki- Torippii, Lion Police Officer (voice)
Saori Sugimoto- Nyakkii Momoyama (voice)
Kikuko Inoue- Shimajiro's Mother (voice)
Nobuo Tobita- Kankachi (voice)
Shinobu Adachi- Mimirin's Mother (voice)
Minoru Inaba- Gaogao-San (voice)
Akiko Toda- Buta (voice)
Akemi Obata (voice)
Yuko Kobayashi (voice)
Shinpachi Tsuji (voice)
Ai Fukada (voice)
Kazumasa Katsura- Gigi (voice)
Shiori Mastuda (voice)
Makiko Yone (voice)
Tatsuya Gashûin- Hermit Crab (voice)
Sayu Kubota- Sea Fairy
Naoto Nojima- Starfish Man
Aki Sasamori- Zota (voice)

Indonesian Actors

Hardi Fadhillah- Flappie (voice)
Leni M. Tarra- Mimi-Lynne (voice)
Lis Kurniasih- Shimajiro (voice)
Jessy Millianty- Nikki (voice)

Korean Voice Cast

Oh Sang-so- Hobi
Song Young-in- Benny
Lee Woo Lee- Pero
Shin Jung-hoon- Rynh
Sang Woo Park- Dr. Leo
배진홍 Bae Jinhong- Hobi
김두리 Kim Duri- Nanyi

Chinese Voice Cast

Xu Shuxuan- Qiaohu
Yang Kaikai
Liu Xihua
Feng Jiade

(2015)

 is a 2015 Japanese children's live action/anime film. It's the third film to feature the character Shimajirō. The theme song of the film is "Hana no Nioi" by Chara. The first part of the film is in live action and the second is animated. The film was released on March 13, 2015.

Japanese Voice Cast

Omi Minami- Shimajiro Shimano (voice)
Miki Takahashi- Mimirin, Hana Shimano (voice)
Takumi Yamazaki- Torippii (voice)
Saori Sugimoto- Nyakkii Momoyama (voice)
Chafûrin- Shimajiro's Father (voice)
Kikuko Inoue- Shimajiro's Mother (voice)
Bin Shimada (voice)
Nobuo Tobita (voice)
Minoru Inaba- Gaogao-San (voice)
Ayahi Takagaki (voice)
Sayaka Nakaya (voice)
Asami Imai (voice)
Kenji Nomura (voice)
Chika Makihara (voice)
Kazushige Watanabe (voice)
Katsumi Suzuki (voice)
Ayumi Tsunematsu (voice)
Satomi Otani (voice)
Sakiko Uran (voice)
Tsuyoshi Hirabayashi (voice)
Tatsuya Gashûin- Froggie (voice)

Korean Voice Actors

Oh Sang-so- Hobby
Song Young-in- Benny
Lee Woo Lee- Pero
Shin Jung-hoon- Rynh
Sang Woo Park- Dr. Leo

Chinese Voice Actors

Xu Shuxuan- Qiaohu
Yang Kaikai
Liu Xihua
Feng Jiade

(2016)

 is the fourth Shimajiro feature film. It was released on March 11, 2016.

Japanese Voice Cast

Omi Minami- Shimajiro Shimano (voice)
Miki Takahashi- Mimi-Lynne, Hana Shimano (voice)
Takumi Yamazaki- Flappie (voice)
Saori Sugimoto- Nyakkii Momoyama (voice)
Kikuko Inoue- Shimajiro's Mother (voice)
Minoru Inaba- Gaogao-san (voice)
Uchida Maaya- Punitan (voice)
Katsuhisa Houki (voice)
Shizuka Itoh (voice)
Kozo Shioya (voice)
Ayumi Yoshida (voice)
Megumi Toda (voice)
Sawako Hata- Kurorin (voice)
Yûka Nakanishi- Iwa (voice)
Marika Minase (voice)
Hitomi Suzuki (voice)
Eri Inagawa (voice)
Marie Shiba (voice)
Honoka Inoue (voice)
Tsuyoshi Hirabayashi (voice)
Yuria Kizaki (AKB48)- Kicky (voice)
Kanon Kimoto (AKB48)- Kicky (voice)

Korean Voice Actors

Oh Sang-so- Hobby
Song Young-in- Benny
Lee Woo Lee- Pero
Shin Jung-hoon- Rynh
Sang Woo Park- Dr. Leo

Chinese Voice Actors

Xu Shuxuan- Qiaohu
Yang Kaikai
Liu Xihua
Feng Jiade

(2017)

 is the fifth feature film in the Shimajirō franchise. It was released on March 10, 2017.

Japanese Voice Cast

南央美 Omi Minami- Shimajiro Shimano (voice)
高橋美紀 Miki Takahashi- Mimirin, Hana (voice)
山崎たくみ Takumi Yamazaki- Torippii (voice)
杉本沙織 Saori Sugimoto- Nyakkii Momoyama (voice)
Chafûrin- Shimajiro's Father (voice)
Kikuko Inoue- Shimajiro's Mother (voice)
稲葉実 Minoru Inaba- Gaogao-San (voice)
Ami Koshimizu (voice)
Aya Hisakawa (voice)
Akio Nojima (voice)
Takayuki Miyamoto (voice)
Shinobu Adachi- Mimirin's Mother (voice)
Mummy D- MC Spike (voice)
山田花子 Hanako Yamada- Rattlesnake (voice)
COWCOW (多田健二 Kenji Tada & 善し Yoshi)- Turtles, Tsurukamezu (voice)

English Voice Actors

Rumiko Varnes- Shimajiro (voice/English)
Vinay Murthy- Flappie (voice/English)
Mirei Yamagata- Mimi-Lynne-Nikki, Flappies Mother (voice/English)
Yuki Toyoda (voice/English)
Cyrus Nozomu Sethna (voice/English)
Jack Merluzzi (voice/English)
Sachiko Hara (voice/English)
Rachel Walzer (voice/English)
Kris Roche (voice/English)
Diana Garnet (voice/English)

Korean Voice Actors

오은수 Oh Sang-so- Hobby
송영인 Song Young-in- Benny
방지원 Lee Woo Lee- Pero
신정훈 Shin Jung-hoon- Rynh
박상우 Sang Woo Park- Dr. Leo
조연우 Yeon Woo Cho

Chinese Voice Actors

許淑嬪 Xu Shuxuan- Qiaohu
楊凱凱 Yang Kaikai
劉錫華 Liu Xihua
馮嘉德 Feng Jiade

(2018)

 is the sixth feature film in the Shimajirō franchise. It was released in 2018.

Japanese Voice Cast

Omi Minami- Shimajiro (voice)
Miki Takahashi- Mimirin, Hana (voice)
Takumi Yamazaki- Torippii (voice)
Saori Sugimoto- Nyakkii Momoyama, Ramurin (voice)
Chafurin (voice)
Kikuko Inoue- Shimajiro's Mother (voice)
Minoru Inaba- Gaogao-San (voice)
Inori Minase (voice)
Ako Mayama (voice)
Bin Shimada- Drill (voice)
Nobuo Tobita (SKE48)- Kanazuchi (voice)
Shinobu Adachi- Pliers (voice)
Nanami Yamashita (voice)
Miki Tokoi (voice)
Mie Nonagase (voice)
Yui Hiwatashi (AKB48) (voice)
Natsuki Kamata (SKE48)- Little Wizard (voice)
Fuka Murakumo (NGT48) (voice)

English Voice Actors

Diana Garnet- Aura (voice)
Rumiko Varnes- Shimajiro (voice/English)
Vinay Murthy- Flappie (voice/English)
Mirei Yamagata- Mimi-Lynne-Nikki, Flappies Mother (voice/English)
Yuki Toyoda (voice/English)
Cyrus Nozomu Sethna (voice/English)
Jack Merluzzi (voice/English)
Sachiko Hara (voice/English)
Rachel Walzer (voice/English)
Kris Roche (voice/English)

Korean Voice Actors

Oh Byon-so- Hobby
Song Young-in- Benny
Lee Woo Lee- Pero
Shin Jung-hoon- Rynh
Sang Woo Park- Dr. Leo
Cho Yeon-woo- Hobby's Father

Chinese Voice Actors

Xu Shuxuan- Qiaohu
Yang Kaikai
Liu Xihua
Feng Jiade

(2019)

 is the seventh feature film in the Shimajirō franchise. It was released in 2019.

Japanese Voice Cast

Omi Minami- Shimajiro Shimano (voice)
Miki Takahashi- Mimirin, Hana Shimano (voice)
Takumi Yamazaki- Torippii (voice)
Saori Sugimoto- Nyakkii Momoyama (voice)
Chafûrin- Shimajiro's Father (voice)
Kikuko Inoue- Shimajiro's Mother (voice)
Minoru Inaba- Gaogao-San (voice)
Katsumi Toriumi(voice)
Nao Tôyama- Ururu (voice)
Eiji Hanawa (voice)
Youhei Tadano (voice)
Taketora (voice)
Ryoko Shiraishi (voice)
Runa Goami (voice)
Kazushige Watanabe (voice)
Natsuko Momota (Momoiro Clover Z) (voice)
Shiori Tamai(Momoiro Clover Z) (voice)
Ayaka Sasaki (Momoiro Clover Z) (voice)
Reni Takagi (Momoiro Clover Z) (voice)
Kaori Asoh- Princess Strawberry (voice)
Ryusei Nakao- Takoyaki Mask (voice)
Mayumi Asano- Captain Mimi (voice)

Qiaohu and the Fantastic Flying Ship (2019)

 also known as (しまじろうとそらとぶふね, Shimajiro and the Fantastic Flying Ship) in Japan, is the eighth feature film in the Shimajirō franchise and the first Shimajiro film to be in CGI animation. It was released in 2019 in Chinese Hong Kong theaters with a runtime of 80 minutes and the later Japanese dub version was originally set to be released in 2020 but was delayed due to the COVID-19 pandemic and was released in Japan on March 12, 2021 and was edited with a runtime of 59 minutes.

Japanese Voice Cast

Omi Minami- Shimajiro Shimano (voice)
Miki Takahashi- Mimirin (voice)
Saori Sugimoto- Nyakkii Momoyama (voice)
Takumi Yamazaki- Torippii (voice)
Minoru Inaba- Gaogao-San (voice)
Megumi Han- Lily (voice)
Yūma Uchida- Jin (voice)
Keiko Han- Lily's Mother (voice)
Tomokazu Sugita- Garbiz boss (voice)

Chinese Voice Cast
Li Ye- Qiaohu
Chen Da-Wei- Tao Le-Bi
Luo Yu-Ting- Qi Qi
Wang Xiao-Tong- Miao Miao
Sun Ye- Doctor Gao Gao
Li Min-Yan- Li Li

The Adventures of Qiaohu Magic Island (2021)

 is the ninth feature film in the Shimajirō franchise and the second Shimajiro film to be in CGI animation.

Chinese Voice Actors
Li Ye- Qiaohu (voice)
Sun Ye- Doctor Gao Gao (voice)
Wang Xiao-Tong- Miao Miao (voice)

Shimajirō to Kirakira Ōkoku no Ōji-sama (2022)

 is the tenth feature film in the Shimajirō franchise. It has been released on March 22, 2022.

Japanese Voice Cast

Omi Minami- Shimajiro Shimano (voice)
Miki Takahashi- Mimirin (voice)
Sugimoto Saori (Posthumous release)- Nyakkii Momoyama (voice)
Takumi Yamazaki- Torippii (voice)
Minoru Inaba- Gaogao-San (voice)
Chafurin as Shimatarō Shimano
Kikuko Inoue as Sakura Shimano (voice)
Shoko Nakagawa as Queen Emeralda
Hiro Shimono as Maron
Junichi Suwabe as Koron
Yuuna Mimura as Prince Pearl

References

External links
  (archive) 
  
  
  
  
 

Benesse
Japanese-language films
Korean-language films
Chinese-language films
2010s English-language films
2020s English-language films
Indonesian-language films
Anime postponed due to the COVID-19 pandemic

2010s Japanese films
2010s South Korean films